Mohsin Khan may refer to:

 Mohsin Khan (cricketer) (born 1955)
 Mohsin Khan (Hong Kong cricketer) (born 1998)
 Mohsin Khan (Indian cricketer) (born 1998)
 Mohsin Khan (actor) (born 1991), Indian television actor
 Mohsin Nazar Khan (born 1928), Pakistani hurdler
 Muhammad Muhsin Khan (1927–2021), Afghan doctor and author